Nirenberg is the surname of the following people:

 David Nirenberg, American historian
 Louis Nirenberg (1925–2020), Canadian-born Canadian-American mathematician
 Marshall Warren Nirenberg (1927–2010), American biochemist and geneticist
 Ron Nirenberg (b. 1977), Mayor of San Antonio, Texas